Škoda Rapid is a name used by the Czech automotive company Škoda Auto, on several different models of car:

 Škoda Rapid (1935–47), saloon car made between 1935 and 1947
 Škoda Rapid (1984), two door coupe based on the Škoda 130, made between 1984 and 1990
 Škoda Rapid (India), Indian built version based on the 2010 Volkswagen Vento
 Škoda Rapid (2012), international market five door hatchback, five door liftback, and 4 door sedan.